Faridan County is in Isfahan province, Iran. The capital of the county is the city of Daran. At the 2006 census, the county's population was 81,622 in 20,215 households. The following census in 2011 counted 79,743 people in 22,770 households. At the 2016 census, the county's population was 49,890 in 15,547 households, by which time Buin Miandasht District had been separated from the county to form Buin Miandasht County.

Administrative divisions

The population history and structural changes of Faridan County's administrative divisions over three consecutive censuses are shown in the following table. The latest census shows two districts, five rural districts, and two cities.

References

 

Counties of Isfahan Province